George Punchard (born in Salem, Massachusetts, 7 June 1806; died in Boston, 2 April 1880) was a New England editor and Congregational clergyman.

Biography
His father, John (1763-1857), served in the Continental Army during the American Revolutionary War. George graduated from Dartmouth College in 1826, and from Andover Theological Seminary in 1829. From 1830 until 1844, he was pastor of a Congregational church in Plymouth, New Hampshire.

Literary activities
Punchard was associate editor and proprietor of the Boston Traveler, of which he was also a founder, from 1845 until 1857, and again from 1867 until 1871. He was secretary of the New England branch of the American Tract Society. He wrote:

View of Congregationalism (Andover, 1850)
History of Congregationalism from A. D. 250 to 1616 (1841; 2d ed., 3 vols., New York, 1865–67)

References

1806 births
1880 deaths
American editors
American Congregationalist ministers
American male writers
People from Salem, Massachusetts
People from Plymouth, New Hampshire
19th-century American clergy